The 1973–74 Indiana Hoosiers men's basketball team represented Indiana University. Their head coach was Bobby Knight, who was in his third year. The team played its home games in Assembly Hall in Bloomington, Indiana, and was a member of the Big Ten Conference.

The Hoosiers finished the regular season with an overall record of 23–5 and a conference record of 12–2, tying Michigan for first place in the Big Ten Conference. Due to the NCAA Tournament rules at the time which allowed only conference champions to participate, Indiana and Michigan faced off for a third game to determine which team would go to the NCAA Tournament. IU lost to Michigan, 75–67, and thus did not participate in the Tournament. Instead, the 1974 Collegiate Commissioners Association Tournament invited second-place teams from eight conferences to participate in their tournament. This was IU's only appearance in the CCAT; however, they did win the championship game.

Roster

Schedule and results

|-
!colspan=8 style=| Regular season
|-

|-
!colspan=8 style=| CCTA Tournament

Rankings

References

Indiana Hoosiers men's basketball seasons
Indiana
Indiana Hoosiers
Indiana Hoosiers